The 2003 Harvard Crimson football team was an American football team that represented Harvard University during the 2003 NCAA Division I-AA football season. Harvard tied for second in the Ivy League.

In their 10th year under head coach Timothy Murphy, the Crimson compiled a 7–3 record and outscored opponents 317 to 221. Dante Balestracci was the team captain.

The Crimson's 4–3 conference record placed them in a four-way tie for second in the Ivy League standings. Harvard outscored Ivy opponents 212 to 151.

Harvard began the year unranked, but a six-game winning streak to start the season saw it enter the national top 25 in early October and climb as high as No. 16. November losses to two unranked opponents dropped the Crimson from the rankings, and they finished the year outside the top 25.

Harvard played its home games at Harvard Stadium in the Allston neighborhood of Boston, Massachusetts.

Schedule

References

Harvard
Harvard Crimson football seasons
Harvard Crimson football
Harvard Crimson football